Leandro da Silva (born 24 August 1973), known as Leandro Cuca or just Cuca, is a Brazilian football coach and former player who played as a defensive midfielder.

Playing career
Born in Blumenau, Santa Catarina, Cuca began his career with Coritiba in 1994. He left the club in 1997 after a loan stint at Londrina, and subsequently represented Iraty, XV de Piracicaba (two stints), Criciúma, Juventus-SP and União Barbarense before moving abroad in 2002, with Portuguese Segunda Liga side União da Madeira.

Cuca returned to his home country in 2004 with Cianorte. He went on to play for Gama, Adap Galo Maringá, Paraná, Chapecoense, Caxias and Universidade, retiring with the latter in 2009 at the age of 36.

Coaching career
After retiring, Cuca worked at J. Malucelli's youth setup before returning to União Barbarense in 2013, as an assistant coach. He was also a manager of the under-20 squad of Figueirense, and also worked as an assistant manager at Paraná and Volta Redonda before being named manager of the latter on 30 August 2015, in the place of sacked Leandro Niehues.

Cuca was himself dismissed by Voltaço on 20 November 2015, and subsequently rejoined Niehues' staff at Vila Nova in March 2016. In June, he was named interim manager after Niehues was sacked.

On 23 December 2016, Cuca was named Fábio Carille's assistant at Corinthians. He subsequently followed Carille to Al-Wehda, Al-Ittihad and Santos, always as his assistant.

Career statistics

Managerial statistics

References

External links

1973 births
Living people
People from Blumenau
Association football midfielders
Brazilian footballers
Campeonato Brasileiro Série A players
Campeonato Brasileiro Série B players
Coritiba Foot Ball Club players
Londrina Esporte Clube players
Esporte Clube XV de Novembro (Piracicaba) players
Criciúma Esporte Clube players
Clube Atlético Juventus players
União Agrícola Barbarense Futebol Clube players
Cianorte Futebol Clube players
Sociedade Esportiva do Gama players
Adap Galo Maringá Football Club players
Paraná Clube players
Associação Chapecoense de Futebol players
Sociedade Esportiva e Recreativa Caxias do Sul players
Canoas Sport Club players
Liga Portugal 2 players
C.F. União players
Brazilian expatriate footballers
Brazilian expatriate sportspeople in Portugal
Expatriate footballers in Portugal
Brazilian football managers
Campeonato Brasileiro Série A managers
Campeonato Brasileiro Série B managers
Campeonato Brasileiro Série D managers
Volta Redonda Futebol Clube managers
Vila Nova Futebol Clube managers
Sport Club Corinthians Paulista managers
Santos FC non-playing staff
Brazilian expatriate sportspeople in Saudi Arabia
Sportspeople from Santa Catarina (state)